Lizemores is an unincorporated community in Clay County, West Virginia, United States. Lizemores has a post office with ZIP code 25125.

The community derives its name from the local Sizemore family (a recording error by postal officials accounts for the error in spelling, which was never corrected).

References

Unincorporated communities in Clay County, West Virginia
Unincorporated communities in West Virginia